Buona Vista is a housing estate located in the subzones of One-north, Queenstown, Singapore.

Buona Vista may also refer to:

 Buona Vista MRT station, a Mass Rapid Transit station that serves the northernmost portion of One-north, Singapore
 Buona Vista Battery, site of two British 15" guns, Singapore
 Buona Vista College, a school in Unawatuna, Galle, Sri Lanka

See also 
 Boa Vista (disambiguation)
 Bonavista (disambiguation)
 Buena Vista (disambiguation)
 Buenavista (disambiguation)